Family Front was a 1997 Pakistani comedy drama sitcom. It was broadcast by the Pakistan Television Corporation (PTV World, now PTV News). This sitcom was directed by Waseem Abbas and written by Muhammad Younis Butt.

The cast included Saba Hameed, Samina Ahmad, Waseem Abbas, Mira Hashmi, Naima Khan, Iram Hassan,Iffat Rahim,Shahzad Nasim and Naseem Vicky. This comedy show became highly popular among the people and ran for many TV seasons. A spin-off sequel to the series, titled as Hum Sab Ajeeb Se Hain is currently airing on Aaj Entertainment.

Cast 
 Waseem Abbas as Azam
 Saba Hameed as Sumbal 
 Samina Ahmad as Nusrat 
 Anjum Shahzad as Naveed "Bobby"
 Naseem Vicky as Khushiya
 Mira Hashmi as Huma in early episodes
 Urooj Nasir as Huma in later episodes
 Ashraf Khan as Dr Qubool
 Semi Raheel as Choti Phopo
 Sardar Kamal as Shaukat
 Naima Khan as Mrs. Kamal
 Iram Hassan
 Nadia Afghan
 Farhana Maqsood
 Nasir Chinyoti
 Sohail Ahmed
 Kashif Mehmood
 Seemi Raheel as Ani
 Abid Khan as Cash Khan, a property dealer
 Iffat Rahim

References 

1990s Pakistani television series
Pakistani drama television series
Pakistani comedy television series
Urdu-language television shows
Pakistan Television Corporation original programming
Pakistani television sitcoms